The initials NZPC can refer to several things, usually associated with New Zealand, including:

New Zealand Performance Car magazine
New Zealand Poker Championship
New Zealand Press Council
New Zealand Prostitutes' Collective
Noordwijkse Zwem en Polo Club, Netherlands